The Underground is a wooden roller coaster manufactured by Custom Coasters International located at Adventureland in Altoona, Iowa. This attraction is located next to the Frantic Freeway. This attraction features two small lift hills to suspend riders. This ride's lifts are unique as no drops are present. While utilizing a roller coaster track system, the attraction is primarily designed as a dark ride. The official description of this attraction is "Tour the old mine and try to solve the mystery of Bad Bob." The attraction features 7 cars per train. Riders are arranged 2 across in 2 rows for a total of 28 riders per train.

Summary
The Underground is themed as an old Iowa coal mine. Entering the attraction's preshow, an animatronic miner explains that Adventureland was built on top of the Underground coal mine and was used as a hideout by outlaws and bank robbers. When Sheriff Sam, a character referenced elsewhere in the park, had heard the robber Bad Bob was using it as a hideout after a large gold heist, he destroyed every known entrance with dynamite to trap Bad Bob inside. However, no one was ever able to find the body and when Adventureland decided to re-open the mines, they ran into unusual setbacks, with the miner suspecting sabotage from Bad Bob's ghost.

As the trains travel through the mine, they pass by various miners at work from pickaxe duty to a tunnel clearing project where a pack mule is acting stubborn with their handler. Passing a waterfall and a worker filling an ore cart below, the train goes up the first lift hill and past a miner peeking through a hole in the wall before going into the darkness and encountering the skeletal ghost of Bad Bob (Accompanied by the opening sting of the title theme of The Good, the Bad, and the Ugly). Moving past a waterfall, the train goes up a second lift hill through a collapsing tunnel and pass a Pepper's ghost illusion of Bad Bob's ghost phasing between a skeletal and mortal form. Going down the tunnel, the train finally passes by Bad Bone's skeletal remains sitting atop a pile of gold and holding a stick of dynamite laughing before the train winds down through the tunnel back to the load station.

References 

 Roller coasters in Iowa
 Dark rides